Cleidson Andrade de Souza Silva (born 27 September 1993), commonly known as Camutanga, is a Brazilian footballer who plays as a central defender for Atlético Goianiense.

Club career
Born in Camutanga, Pernambuco, he began his career with Auto Esporte at the age of 18, before joining Sport Recife's youth setup after being approved on a trial.

In March 2016, Camutanga joined Santa Rita. In April, he was announced at ASA, but the move never materialized, and he was loaned to CSA in May.

Upon returning to Santa Rita for the 2017 season, Camutanga was an undisputed starter before moving on loan to Série D side Bangu on 29 April. On 15 December, he signed for Náutico in the Série C.

Camutanga became a regular starter for Timbu, and helped in the club's promotion to the Série B in 2019. On 8 June 2021, he renewed his contract until the end of 2022.

On 26 June 2022, Camutanga agreed to join Série A side Atlético Goianiense, with the deal being effective on 18 July.

Career statistics

Honours
Náutico
Campeonato Brasileiro Série C: 2019
Campeonato Pernambucano: 2021, 2022

References

External links

1988 births
Living people
Sportspeople from Minas Gerais
Brazilian footballers
Association football defenders
Campeonato Brasileiro Série B players
Campeonato Brasileiro Série C players
Campeonato Brasileiro Série D players
Auto Esporte Clube players
Associação Acadêmica e Desportiva Vitória das Tabocas men's players
Associação Atlética Santa Rita players
Centro Sportivo Alagoano players
Bangu Atlético Clube players
Clube Náutico Capibaribe players
Atlético Clube Goianiense players